Gianpiero Pastore (born 7 May 1976 in Salerno) is an Italian fencer and Olympic medal winner in team sabre competition.

References

External links
 

1976 births
Living people
Italian male fencers
Olympic fencers of Italy
Fencers at the 2000 Summer Olympics
Fencers at the 2004 Summer Olympics
Fencers at the 2008 Summer Olympics
Olympic silver medalists for Italy
Olympic bronze medalists for Italy
Olympic medalists in fencing
Medalists at the 2008 Summer Olympics
Medalists at the 2004 Summer Olympics
Universiade medalists in fencing
Sportspeople from the Province of Salerno
Universiade silver medalists for Italy
Fencers of Centro Sportivo Carabinieri
Medalists at the 2001 Summer Universiade